Nakkash Ki Devi - Gomti Dham Temple is a Hindu temple, situated in the Hindaun City, in the Indian state of Rajasthan. This temple is at the heart of Hindaun City, with adjacent sacred pond known as Jalsen Reservoir. The temple is located on the banks of the Jalsen Talab. Nakkash Ki Devi is a Hindu Devi Temple of Durga and Gomti Dham is the biggest Temple in Hindaun City of Gomti Dass Ji Maharaj.

References

Hindu temples in Rajasthan
Tourist attractions in Karauli district
Tourist attractions in Hindaun
Hindaun